Cautionary Tales for the Brave is a 2005 mini-album by the British New prog band Pure Reason Revolution. Singer Chloe Alper described the album as "a kind of warm up to The Dark Third". Most of the tracks appear on their debut album The Dark Third, with the exception of "In Aurelia", with Jon Courtney saying that they were initially written to be released on that album before Sony BMG decided to release a mini-album, prompting the band to write more songs.

Track listing 
All tracks by Jon Courtney except where noted

 "In Aurélia" - 3:50
 "The Bright Ambassadors Of Morning" (Courtney, Greg Jong) - 11:50
 "Arrival/The Intention Craft" - 8:35
 "He Tried To Show Them Magic/Ambassadors Return" - 5:30

Personnel 
 Jon Courtney - Vocals, Guitar, keyboards
 Chloe Alper - Vocals & Bass
 Andrew Courtney - Drums
 James Dobson - Vocals, Keyboard, Guitar, Bass & Violin
 Greg Jong - Vocals, Guitar

References 

2005 albums
Pure Reason Revolution albums